Radha Bharathi is an Indian film director who has worked on Tamil and Kannada language films. He was active in the early 1990s and worked on two high-profile films featuring actor Prashanth, and has since worked on a few low budget projects.

Career
Radha Bharathi made his directorial debut with Vaigasi Poranthachu (1990) and continued to make village-centric action films in the early 1990s, collaborating with Saravanan for back-to-back ventures. He then made another film with Prashanth, Kizhakke Varum Paattu (1993), before working in films as a script and story writer rather than being a director. He re-emerged in 2000 by helming the Kannada film Yajamana alongside Sheshadri, before making Kaatrullavarai (2005), a romantic film with Jai Akash in the lead.

Radha Bharathi made a comeback to Tamil films with Nanbargal Narpani Mandram (2015), a comedy entertainer featuring newcomers, which had a low profile release in May 2015.

Filmography
Director

Writer
Thangathin Thangam (1990)
Periya Idathu Pillai (1990)

References

External links

Living people
Kannada film directors
Tamil film directors
Year of birth missing (living people)
20th-century Indian film directors